Dead Dudes in the House (also known as The Dead Come Home or The House on Tombstone Hill) is a 1989 independent horror film written and directed by James Riffel and distributed by Troma Entertainment. The film follows a group of teenagers who travel up to a dilapidated house for some fixing up. Unbeknownst to them, the house is occupied by a murderous old woman and her sultry daughter, who proceed to pick the teens off one by one.

Cast
 James Griffin
 J. D. Cerna (billed as John Dayton Cerna)
 Sarah Newhouse
 Douglas Gibson
 Victor Verhaeghe
 Mark Zobian
 Rob Moretti

Home media
In 1992, the film was released on VHS by Troma Entertainment and A.I.P. Home Video under the title The House on Tombstone Hill. The film was also released on VHS by Troma as Dead Dudes in the House, with cover art featuring a group of "hip-hop teens", none of whom appear in the film. In 2010, Troma released the film on DVD.

On September 25, 2018, the film was restored and released on DVD and Blu-ray by Vinegar Syndrome as The House on Tombstone Hill.

References

External links

 Dead Dudes in the House – at the Troma Entertainment movie database

1989 films
American independent films
Troma Entertainment films
1989 horror films
1980s English-language films
1980s American films